Jean Galfione (born 9 June 1971 in Paris) is a French retired pole vaulter. During his pole vaulting career, he won at least one medal in each of the following major international competitions - the Olympic Games, the World Championships, the World Indoor Championships, the European Championships and the European Indoors Championships

Pole vaulting career

Before the 1996 Olympic Games
Jean Galfione started pole vaulting as part of the decathlon when he was 13 years old and a member of the Stade français sports club. He was talent-spotted by Maurice Houvion, who was a coach at INSEP. In 1987, he became part of the group of pole vaulters trained by Houvion at INSEP. In 1988, he broke the pole vault national youth
record by clearing 5.16m. In 1990, he won the World Junior Championships pole vault gold medal with a jump of 5.45m and also broke the pole vault national junior indoor record with a jump of 5.60m.

Galfione clinched his first Olympic or World Outdoor/Indoor Championships medal when he won the pole vault bronze medal at the 1993 World Indoor Championships.

Galfione won six successive Championnats de France d'athlétisme (French National Athletics Championships) outdoor pole vault titles at the senior level from 1993 to 1998. He also won three Championnats de France d'athlétisme (French National Athletics Championships) indoor pole vault titles at the senior level in 1990, 1993 and 1994.

1996 Olympic Games
Galfione achieved the pinnacle of his pole vault career by winning the pole vault gold medal at the 1996 Olympics in Atlanta, Georgia. In the final of that competition, all the three medallists registered the same greatest height of 5.92m. Whereas Galfione and Igor Trandenkov both cleared 5.92m on their first attempt, Andrei Tivontchik could only clear 5.92m on his second attempt. Galfione had cleared 5.86m (the previous highest height) on his first attempt, whereas Trandenkov had two successive misses at 5.86m and chose to use his third and final attempt to clear 5.92m instead. Since all these three pole vaulters and no one else had succeeded in clearing 5.92m, the podium positions were still undecided. All of them subsequently had three consecutive misses in attempting to clear heights greater than 5.92m, and the contest was therefore declared over. Thus under the tie-breaking rules, Galfione (he had fewer misses in the final than Trandenkov) won the gold medal, with Trandenkov taking the silver and Tivontchik taking the bronze. Galfione's 5.92m winning clearance was a new Olympic record that was 2 cm higher than the previous Olympic record achieved by Sergey Bubka in the 1988 Olympics pole vault final. "This is one of the most beautiful days of my life," Galfione said right after the end of the competition. "All my hard work and patience have paid off. This is absolutely the result of my hard work. The competition was long and tough, but I recovered very well after every jump."

After the 1996 Olympic Games
On 6 March 1999, Galfione won the 1999 World Indoor Championships pole vault title, clearing 6.00m (which equalled Sergey Bubka's championship record set in the 1991 final) in the final. 
At first, Galfione's clearance at that height was ruled invalid because it appeared that he had illegally touched the bar with his hand. But after the French team lodged an appeal, the decision to rule Galfione's 6.00m clearance invalid was reversed, and he was declared the winner of the competition. If the original ruling had stood, Jeff Hartwig would have been the winner. Later in that competition, Galfione had three consecutive misses  at 6.05m. Galfione thus became the first Frenchman to clear 6 metres or more indoors or outdoors in the pole vault. He also became only the fourth pole vaulter, after Sergey Bubka, Rodion Gataullin and Maksim Tarasov, to clear 6 metres or more indoors. That 6.00m mark would remain as the French national indoor pole vault record for 12 years until 5 March 2011, when Renaud Lavillenie broke it with a jump of 6.03m in the 2011 European Indoor Championships pole vault final. Galfione held the French national outdoor pole vault record from 1993 to 2009. On 21 June 2009, Renaud Lavillenie broke Galfione's French national outdoor pole vault record of 5.98m (set in Amiens on 23 July 1999), with a jump of 6.01m.

From 2000 to 2002, Galfione was plagued with numerous injuries. He underwent surgery on a collapsed lung suffered during an interclub competition in Paris in May 2000. He underwent another operation in July 2002.

Galfione participated in the 2000 Olympics pole vault event in Sydney. In the qualification round, after clearing the bar at 5.40m and 5.55m (both at the first attempts), he failed with his three attempts at 5.65m. He finished the qualification round in joint 16th position and did not qualify for the final.

Galfione could not take part in the 2004 Olympics because he failed to clear the minimum Olympic qualifying height.

Galfione retired from pole vaulting in 2005.

Later life
Galfione has been practising sailing competitively since 2007. Among the sailing races that he has participated in are: the 2007 Louis Vuitton Cup and the 2012 Solidaire du Chocolat.

Galfione also worked as an athletics commentator and consultant for Canal Plus and presented documentaries for the French television channel, Voyage.

Family
Jean Galfione comes from a sporting family.

Both his parents were sportspersons. His father (Serge) was a fencer and his mother (Michèle, Serge's wife) was a gymnast who was a French national junior gymnastics champion.

Jean Galfione has one brother (Olivier, who is an actor) and one sister (Sophie, who is a model), and is a nephew of an Olympic medal-winning fencer, Jean-Claude Magnan. He and Clothilde Magnan, Jean-Claude Magnan's daughter and who was also a fencer, are thus first cousins.

On 14 May 2013, Jean Galfione's companion since 2011, Cathy, gave birth to a baby girl, Rose. Rose was Galfione's first child.

International competitions
Only the position and height in the final are indicated, unless otherwise stated. (q) means the athlete did not qualify for the final, with the overall position and height in the qualification round indicated.

See also 
 List of pole vaulters who cleared 6 metres or more
 French all-time top lists - Pole vault

References

External links 

 
 
 
 
 

1971 births
Living people
French male pole vaulters
Olympic athletes of France
Olympic gold medalists for France
Athletes (track and field) at the 1992 Summer Olympics
Athletes (track and field) at the 1996 Summer Olympics
Athletes (track and field) at the 2000 Summer Olympics
World Athletics Championships athletes for France
World Athletics Championships medalists
European Athletics Championships medalists
Medalists at the 1996 Summer Olympics
Athletes from Paris
Olympic gold medalists in athletics (track and field)
Mediterranean Games bronze medalists for France
Athletes (track and field) at the 1993 Mediterranean Games
Universiade medalists in athletics (track and field)
Goodwill Games medalists in athletics
Mediterranean Games medalists in athletics
Universiade bronze medalists for France
World Athletics Indoor Championships winners
Medalists at the 1993 Summer Universiade
Competitors at the 1998 Goodwill Games